Jean Mahseredjian is an electrical engineer at the Ecole Polytechnique de Montreal, Quebec. He was named a Fellow of the Institute of Electrical and Electronics Engineers (IEEE) in 2013 for his contributions to the computation and modeling of power system transients.

References

Fellow Members of the IEEE
Living people
Year of birth missing (living people)
Place of birth missing (living people)